The Chief of Army Staff (COAS) has been the title of the professional head of the Nigerian Army since 1966. Prior to 1966, the title was General Officer Commanding, Nigerian Army (GOCNA). Since 1980, the post has been immediately subordinate to the Chief of Defence Staff, the post held by the professional head of the Nigerian Armed Forces. The position is often occupied by the most senior commissioned officer appointed by the President of Nigeria.

The current Chief of Army Staff is Lieutenant General Farouk Yahaya, who succeeded Lieutenant General Ibrahim Attahiru, in May 2021 a few days after he died in an Air Crash.

Role
In the chain of command, the Chief of Army Staff reports to the Chief of Defence Staff, who in turn, reports to the Defence Minister, accountable to the President of Nigeria.
The Statutory duty of the Officer is to formulate and execute policies towards the highest attainment of National Security and operational competence of the Nigerian Army.

Chiefs of the Nigerian Army
Following is a chronological list of officers holding the position of General Officer Commanding (GOC) or Chief of Army Staff (COAS).

General Officer Commanding

Chief of Army Staff

See also
Nigerian Army Day

References

Nigerian Army appointments
Nigeria